Mud Springs, California may refer to:
 El Dorado, California
 Richardson Springs, California
  An early settlement that preceded San Dimas, California was called Mud Springs.